Pantelis Melachroinoudis (born May 6, 1985 in Athens) is a Greek sprinter, who specialized in the 400 metres. Melachroinoudis competed for the men's 4 × 400 m relay at the 2008 Summer Olympics in Beijing, along with his teammates Stylianos Dimotsios, Konstadinos Anastasiou, and Dimitrios Gravalos. He ran on the third leg of the second heat, with an individual-split time of 45.15 seconds. Melachroinoudis and his team finished the relay in seventh place for a seasonal best time of 3:04.30, failing to advance into the final.

Honours

References

External links

NBC 2008 Olympics profile

Greek male sprinters
Living people
Olympic athletes of Greece
Athletes (track and field) at the 2008 Summer Olympics
Athletes from Athens
1985 births
Mediterranean Games bronze medalists for Greece
Mediterranean Games medalists in athletics
Athletes (track and field) at the 2009 Mediterranean Games